Darren Morgan is a Welsh snooker player.

Darren Morgan may also refer to:

Darren Morgan (Australian footballer) (born 1965), former VFL/AFL player
Darren Morgan (footballer, born 1967), English football player